Olivier Chaline (29 December 1964, Neuilly-sur-Seine) is a contemporary French historian, a specialist of the history of Central Europe.

Biography 
The son of Jean-Pierre Chaline, himself an historian (a specialist on the French Third Republic), and Nadine-Josette Chaline, also an historian, Olivier Chaline entered the École Normale Supérieure (ENS) in 1984. After he obtained his agrégation in history, he taught at the ENS before being appointed at the University of Rennes II (1999–2001) then at the Paris-Sorbonne University. He occasionally teaches at Charles University at Prague.

In 2006, Olivier Chaline was bestowed the Prix Guizot of the Académie française for his Le Règne de Louis XIV.

Main works 
1996: La France au XVIIIe siècle, 1715–1787, Belin, Paris,  ;
1996: Godart de Belbeuf. Le Parlement, le roi et les Normands, Bertout,  
1998: La Reconquête catholique de l’Europe centrale, XVIe–XVIIIe siècle, Éditions du Cerf, Paris,   
1999: La Place du Vieux-Marché et le Martyre de Jeanne d'Arc, 
2000: La Bataille de la Montagne Blanche (8 novembre 1620). Un mystique chez les guerriers, Noesis, Paris , Prize XVIIe in 2001 ;
2005: Le Règne de Louis XIV, Flammarion, 
2009: L'Année des quatre dauphins, Flammarion, .
2010: 
2010: 
2016: La mer et la France. Quand les Bourbons voulaient dominer les océans, Flammarion

Honours 
 Chevalier de l’Ordre national du Mérite (2011)

References

External links 
 Olivier Chaline on the site of the Académie française
 L'année Louis XIV on Histoire pour tous
 Olivier Chaline La bataille de la Montagne Blanche on CAIRN
 Olivier CAIRN publications on CAIRN
 Les armées du Roi Le grand chantier - XVIIe-XVIIIe siècle, Olivier Chaline, Michel Figeac on Armand Colin
 "Bibliothèque Medicis": Louis XIV Public Sénat  10/04/2009

20th-century French historians
21st-century French historians
École Normale Supérieure alumni
Academic staff of Rennes 2 University
Knights of the Ordre national du Mérite
People from Neuilly-sur-Seine
1964 births
Living people